Joaquim Costa Puig (born October 30, 1957, in Badalona, Catalonia, Spain), commonly known as Quim Costa, is a retired Spanish professional basketball player, and a current professional basketball coach.

Playing career
Costa played in 71 caps for the Spain national basketball team.

Awards
Liga ACB (5): 1982–83, 1986–87, 1987–88, 1988–89, 1989–90
Copa del Rey (3): 1982–83, 1986–87, 1987–88
Korać Cup (1): 1986–87
Copa Príncipe de Asturias (1): 1987–88

References
 Spanish League Player Profile  
 Spanish League Coach Profile 

1957 births
Living people
People from Badalona
Sportspeople from the Province of Barcelona
Spanish men's basketball players
1982 FIBA World Championship players
Spanish basketball coaches
Basketball players from Catalonia
Liga ACB players
FC Barcelona Bàsquet players
CB Girona players
Joventut Badalona players
Point guards
1986 FIBA World Championship players